This is a list of notable custom software projects which have significantly failed to achieve some or all of their objectives, either temporarily or permanently, and/or have suffered from significant cost overruns. For a list of successful major custom software projects, see Custom software#Major project successes.

Note that failed projects, and projects running over budget, are not necessarily the sole fault of the employees or businesses creating the software. In some cases, problems may be due partly to problems with the purchasing organisation, including poor requirements, over-ambitious requirements, unnecessary requirements, poor contract drafting, poor contract management, poor end-user training, or poor operational management.

Permanent failures 
Because software, unlike a major civil engineering construction project, is often easy and cheap to change after it has been constructed, a piece of custom software that fails to deliver on its objectives may sometimes be modified over time in such a way that it later succeeds—and/or business processes or end-user mindsets may change to accommodate the software. However, sometimes, for various reasons, neither approach succeeds (or is even tried), and this may be considered as another level of failure—a permanent failure.

Temporary issues and budget overruns

Projects with ongoing problems 
Until the significant problems with these projects are resolved, or the projects cancelled, it is not yet possible to classify them into one of the above categories.

See also
 Software crisis
 Vaporware
 Agile software development
 Government waste

References

External links
 The Risks Digest
 
 Best Practices and Measures for Success of your ERP IT Software Projects

Failed and overbudget custom
 
Failed and overbudget custom software projects